George McClelland Foster Jr. (October 9, 1913 – May 18, 2006) was an American anthropologist at the University of California, Berkeley, best known for contributions on peasant societies (the "principle of limited good" and the "Dyadic Contract") and as one of the founders of medical anthropology. He served as president of the American Anthropological Association (elected 1970).  And was elected member of the U.S. National Academy of Sciences (elected 1976)and  American Academy of Arts and Sciences (elected 1980). He received the 1982  Malinowski Award from the Society for Applied Anthropology and the  Lifetime Achievement Award from the Society for Medical Anthropology in 2005. A festschrift in his honor was published in 1979. He was married to the linguist Mary LeCron Foster, and in 1997 the U.C. Berkeley anthropology library was renamed the George and Mary Foster Anthropology Library in their honor.

Selected publications
 Foster, George M. (1960) Culture and Conquest: America's Spanish Heritage, Viking Fund Publications in Anthropology No. 27. New York: Wenner-Gren Foundation for Anthropological Research.
 Foster, George M. (1961) The Dyadic Contract: A model for social structure of a Mexican peasant village. Am. Anthropol. 63:1173–1192.
 Foster, George M.(1962) Traditional Cultures and the Impact of Technological Change, New York: Harper & Bros.
 Foster, George M.(1967) Tzintzuntzan: Mexican Peasants in a Changing World, Boston: Little, Brown and Co.

References

External links
Robert V. Kemper, "George McClelland Foster Jr.", Biographical Memoirs of the National Academy of Sciences (2007)
Finding Aid to the George McClelland Foster Papers, 1934–2005, The Bancroft Library

1913 births
2006 deaths
University of California, Berkeley College of Letters and Science faculty
Members of the United States National Academy of Sciences
Fellows of the American Academy of Arts and Sciences
20th-century American anthropologists